Sydney Hyde Cooper (5 February 1913 – 20 January 1982) was an English first-class cricketer active 1936 who played for Surrey. He was born in Carshalton; died in Wallington.

References

1913 births
1982 deaths
English cricketers
Surrey cricketers